What's Up, Doc? is a Looney Tunes cartoon film directed by Robert McKimson and produced by Warner Bros. Cartoons.  It was released by Warner Bros. Pictures in 1950 to celebrate Bugs Bunny's 10th birthday that year, in which he recounts his life story to a reporter from the "Disassociated Press". Bugs talks about his birth, his rise to fame, the slow years, and how famous Vaudeville performer Elmer Fudd chooses him to be part of his act. Eventually the duo comes upon their classic formula of Hunter vs. Hare. The short also was the first (since The Unruly Hare) to use the title card music which would continue to be used in Bugs Bunny's cartoons. Arthur Q. Bryan, Dave Barry and The Sportsmen Quartet performed voice works were not credited.

Plot 
While relaxing by his pool, Bugs Bunny grants a phone interview to the "Disassociated Press", regarding his life story and rise to fame. 

Bugs relates that soon after his birth, he realized he was "a rabbit in a human world." Showing early talent in both piano and ballet, Bugs pursues a professional career as a Broadway star, but only manages to be a chorus boy in three productions: Girl of the Golden Vest, Wearing of the Grin, and Rosie's Cheeks. Afterward, he is approached by a producer of an unnamed show. The show's star has become ill, and the producer wants Bugs to take his place. He agrees, but the audience is unimpressed by his performance, and he is hooked off-stage. Angered at the prospect of resuming work as a chorus boy, Bugs quits show business until he's offered the "right part".

That winter, Bugs confines himself to a bench in Central Park, along with other out of him work actors who happen to be Al Jolson, Jack Benny, Eddie Cantor, and Bing Crosby. One night Elmer Fudd, while passing through, recognizes Bugs, chides him for hanging out with the other actors Elmer thinks have no future, and offers him a role as his sidekick in his vaudeville act. Bugs accepts, and the two embark on a nationwide tour. The act consists of Elmer physically delivering joke punchlines to Bugs. After several performances, Bugs tires of being on the receiving end of Elmer’s gags and delivers the punchlines himself. This infuriates Elmer, who draws a shotgun on Bugs. Bugs replies, "What's up, doc?" to the audience’s delight. This results in fan mail, offers pouring in, and ultimately a call from Warner Bros. Elmer and Bugs pass a screen test in which they perform the title musical number, and the studio signs them on as film stars.

The story reverts to the present day. Bugs looks at his watch and notices that he is late to the set to begin filming his first role, in a film that was written with him in mind. At the filming, it is revealed that the part is chorus boy yet again, much to Bugs' chagrin.

Notes 

 Bugs turns down dozens of scripts, including one entitled Life With Father. Bugs predicts: "Ehhh...this will never be a hit." It actually ran for 3,224 performances (1939-1947) on Broadway, making it the longest-running non-musical play in Broadway history.
Al Jolson, Jack Benny, Eddie Cantor and Bing Crosby, major stars of that time, are caricatured as park bums, who each do their routine when Elmer Fudd shows up. Elmer spots Bugs and asks, "Why are you hanging around these guys? They'll never amount to anything."

Home media
The cartoon is available on the Looney Tunes Golden Collection: Volume 1 DVD set.

See also 
What's Up, Doc?, a 1972 comedy film starring Barbra Streisand and Ryan O'Neal (which closes with a clip from this cartoon).
What's Up Doc?, a UK Saturday morning children's show in the early 1990s

References

External links 

 
 

1950 films
1950 animated films
1950 short films
1950s Warner Bros. animated short films
Looney Tunes shorts
Films directed by Robert McKimson
Animation based on real people
Cultural depictions of Al Jolson
Cultural depictions of Bing Crosby
Cultural depictions of Frank Sinatra
Films scored by Carl Stalling
Bugs Bunny films
1950s English-language films
Elmer Fudd films
Films about actors